Afang soup (not to be misconstrued for Okazi soup or Ukazi soup, a soup from the Igbo cuisine), is a vegetable soup that originates from the Efik people of the Efik kingdom in Cross River State and the Ibibio People of Akwa Ibom in Southern Nigeria. It is a dish popularly known by Nigerians and also some parts of Africa. It is especially popular among the Ibibio and the Anang people of Akwa Ibom and Cross River state who have adopted this cuisine as part of their cultural identity. It's served at homes and also sometimes in ceremonies such as weddings, burials, festivals etc. mostly in the southern part of Nigeria. Afang soup is very nutritious and  the cost of preparation can be adaptable based on family needs.

Ingredient 
The ingredients used to prepare Afang soup include beef, fish, palm oil, crayfish, pepper, Shaki (cow tripe), waterleaf, okazi leaf, onion, periwinkle salt and some other seasonings.

References 

Nigerian cuisine
African soups
Vegetable soups